Jóhan á Plógv Hansen (born 1 May 1994) is a Faroese-born Danish handballer for SG Flensburg-Handewitt  and the Danish national team.

He has previously represented Faroe Islands national team, but due to the structure of the Danish Realm Greenlandic and Faeroese players can themselves decide which national team they wish to represent. As Hansen had already played for Faroe Islands national team, his wishes about representing the Danish national team resulted in a two-year suspension from international handball. Former Danish national coach Ulrik Wilbek expressed that he hoped and wished for Jóhan Hansen to change his nationality in order to be available for the Danish national team.

Club career

Childhood and youth 
Hansen started his handball career with the Faroese club Kyndil in Thórshavn at the age of 4, coached by his aunt Marjun á Plógv. Until the age of 10 he played as a goal keeper just like his aunt, but then he changed to play as right backcourt. He played football alongside his handball, he played with Havnar Bóltfelag (HB Tórshavn) and made the cut for the Faroe Islands U15 national football team. However, in the end he decided to stick with handball.

Skanderborg Håndbold
In 2010 he was selected to join SHEA – Skanderborg Håndbold Elite Academy and moved to Denmark shortly after turning 16 years old.

Bjerringbro-Silkeborg
On 3 March 2015 it was announced that Johan Hansen would join Bjerringbro-Silkeborg on a three-year contract, starting at the 2015–16 season. The transfer meant that Johan Hansen was bought free of his contract with Skanderborg Håndbold, with whom he had one year left on his contract.

National team career
In 2012 he represented Faroe Islands in the 2012 EHF Challenge Trophy. They made it all the way to final, where they lost to Moldova.

Jóhan á Plógv Hansen won silver with the Danish national U21 handball team in 2015 in Brazil. He was chosen as one of the best players and became one of the All Star team as the best right wing player.

On 29 May 2015 he was called up to the Danish national team as a part of the squad in the 2016 European Men's Handball Championship qualification. He made his debut for the Danish national team on 10 June 2015 in a match against Lithuania.

Honours
World Championship
: 2021
: 2019
Danish Championship:
: 2016

References

External links

1994 births
Living people
People from Tórshavn
Danish male handball players
Faroese male handball players
Handball-Bundesliga players
Handball players at the 2020 Summer Olympics
Medalists at the 2020 Summer Olympics
Olympic silver medalists for Denmark
Olympic medalists in handball
SG Flensburg-Handewitt players